"Wake Up Little Susie" is a popular song written by Felice and Boudleaux Bryant and published in 1957.

The song is best known in a recording by the Everly Brothers, issued by Cadence Records as catalog number 1337. The Everly Brothers record reached No. 1 on the Billboard Pop chart and the Cash Box Best Selling Records chart, despite having been banned from Boston radio stations for lyrics that, at the time, were considered suggestive, according to a 1986 interview with Don Everly. "Wake Up Little Susie" also spent seven weeks atop the Billboard country chart and got to No. 2 on the UK Singles Chart. The song was ranked at No. 318 on the Rolling Stone magazine's list of "The 500 Greatest Songs of All Time".

Song premise
The song is written from the point of view of a high school boy to his girlfriend, Susie.  In the song, the two go out on a date to a cinema (perhaps a drive-in), only to fall asleep during the movie.  They do not wake up until 4 o'clock in the morning, well after her 10 o'clock curfew.  They then contemplate the reactions of her parents and their friends. The boy fears that having stayed out so late, their friends and families will assume that they had sex together and that in spite of the two of them being perfectly innocent, they've both now lost their good reputations.

Personnel
 Don Everly – vocals, rhythm guitar
 Phil Everly – vocals, rhythm guitar
 Floyd “Lightnin’ Chance – double bass

Charts
All versions

The Everly Brothers version

Simon & Garfunkel version

Simon and Garfunkel version

Simon and Garfunkel have cited the Everly Brothers as strong influences on their own music. Their live version of "Wake Up Little Susie", recorded in the duo's concert in New York's Central Park on September 19, 1981, reached #27 on the Billboard Hot 100 in 1982, and is the duo's last Top 40 hit.

During Simon and Garfunkel's "Old Friends" tour in 2003–2004, they performed this song and others in a segment with the Everly Brothers, who toured in support.

See also
Banned in Boston
List of Billboard number-one rhythm and blues hits
List of Billboard number-one singles of 1957
Billboard year-end top 50 singles of 1957
List of Cash Box Best Sellers number-one singles of 1957
List of CHUM number-one singles of 1957
List of number-one country singles of 1957 (U.S.)

References

1957 singles
1982 singles
Billboard Top 100 number-one singles
Grateful Dead songs
Live singles
Rockabilly songs
Simon & Garfunkel songs
Songs written by Felice and Boudleaux Bryant
The Everly Brothers songs
1957 songs
Cadence Records singles
Censorship of music
Obscenity controversies in music